An acre is a unit of measurement used for areas of land.

Acre may also refer to:

Places
Acre, Israel, a historic city in Israel
Sanjak of Acre, a prefecture of the Ottoman Empire, located in present-day Israel 
Acre (state), a Brazilian state
Republic of Acre, a series of separatist governments in then Bolivia's Acre region (1899-1903)
Acre River, running through Peru, Bolivia, and Brazil
Acre, Lancashire, a village in Lancashire, England
Heroes' Acre (Namibia), a Namibian war memorial
National Heroes Acre (Zimbabwe), a Zimbabwean war memorial
The Acre, a historic house in Harrisville, New Hampshire, USA

Other uses
Acre (Cheshire), a historical unit of area in Cheshire, England
Acre (surname)
Acre-class destroyer a class of Brazilian ships
Acre (Freebase), a JavaScript application hosting environment for Freebase
Action with Communities in Rural England, an English charity
Alliance of Conservatives and Reformists in Europe, a European political party
Atmospheric Circulation Reconstructions over the Earth, a science project

See also
Aakra or Åkra (disambiguation)
Abba of Acre (fl. 3rd century)
Accra, the capital of Ghana
Acer (disambiguation)
Acra (disambiguation)
Acres (surname)
Aker (disambiguation)
Akra (disambiguation)
Akre (disambiguation)
Aqra (disambiguation)
Joan of Acre (1272–1307), English princess
Town acre